was a Japanese botanist and professor at the University of Tokyo. His research focus was bryology and pteridology. His undergraduate studies were at Doshisha University and the University of Tokyo. His graduated studies were at Cornell University, where he received his MA in 1901 and PhD in 1902. After finishing his PhD, Miyake was appointed by the government of Taiwan to travel to Europe and perform a two-year study of plant life there.

References

External links
 
 Miyake's detailed description of the laboratory and botanical garden at Tokyo Imperial University.
 Miyake's US patent for raw materials made from coconut palms.

1876 births
1964 deaths
20th-century Japanese botanists
Academic staff of the University of Tokyo
University of Tokyo alumni
Doshisha University alumni
Cornell University alumni
Botanists with author abbreviations